is a Japanese video game development studio mostly known for its work on the .hack series, along with a series of fighting games based on the Naruto franchise. They are also known for creating the Little Tail Bronx series (e.g. Tail Concerto and Solatorobo: Red the Hunter). In 2016, they expanded their workforce into the international market by opening a studio in Montreal, Canada.

History
CyberConnect2 was first formed on February 16, 1996 as CyberConnect in Fukuoka, Japan. On September 16, 2001, it was renamed CyberConnect2. On October 3, 2007, CyberConnect2 changed their logo and expanded their production beyond games, beginning with the formation of Sensible Art Innovation to create the .hack//G.U. Trilogy, and LieN to compose the music.

CyberConnect2 opened a studio in Tokyo, Japan in 2010, and later opened their first international studio in Montreal, Canada in 2016. The Fukuoka location remains the parent company.

CyberConnect2 was tasked with developing the Final Fantasy VII Remake, described in CyberConnect2's March 2015 Famitsu job advertisement as a photo-realistic role-playing game targeted at the international market built on the Unreal Engine 4 involving physically based rendering. In May 2017, it was announced that they had left the project due to unreasonable management from above, and Square Enix moved the remaining development of Final Fantasy VII Remake in-house.

Current projects

As of 2015, CyberConnect2 is currently working on two projects for current generation consoles. The first is open world. The second involves virtual reality.

It was also stated during a live broadcast on NicoNico that CyberConnect2 will announce their "future vision" for the company, leading them through the next decade. This announcement will first appear in the February 1 issue of Famitsu Magazine.

List of video games

Films
CyberConnect2 also produced two computer animated films for the .hack franchise. The first one, .hack//G.U. Trilogy, is an adaptation of the .hack//G.U. games and was released in December 2007. The second film is .hack//The Movie, which was released on January 21, 2012.

References

External links
 

Video game companies of Japan
Video game development companies
Video game companies established in 1996
Japanese companies established in 1996
Companies based in Fukuoka Prefecture